Stické, also called stické tennis, is an indoor racquet sport invented in the late 19th century merging aspects of real tennis, racquets and lawn tennis.

Manner of play
Stické is played with standard lawn tennis racquets and low pressure balls in an enclosed court.  The court is somewhat similar to a real tennis court in shape, but is smaller (about 78 feet by 27 feet) and different in construction.  Play takes place using all the basics of lawn tennis and the same scoring system, with the addition of side and back walls.  Players face each other over the net in pairs. 

As in real tennis, there is a penthouse, used throughout the game as a playing surface and on which the service has to land to start each point. Some courts have a penthouse only down the side, while others have a penthouse at both ends as well.

History
There were over 50 courts built throughout the British Empire since 1875. The dimensions of the Taplow Court built by Lord Desborough in 1892 became the standard. In the early 20th century, stické was a popular recreation at many country houses. At the time it was one of the few games that was played by both men and women.

As of 2005 there are only three playable courts remaining:

 Hartham Park in Corsham, Wiltshire (England). Built in 1904 out of wood.
 Knightshayes Court in Tiverton, Devon (England). Built in 1907 out of wood.
 Viceregal Lodge complex, Indian Institute of Advanced Study, Shimla, Himachal Pradesh (India).

Both English courts have active player groups, with an exception of Knightshayes during August to November 2015. During this time, the court was used to present an exhibition on the First World War, as the stické court was used throughout both the world wars as wards for wounded soldiers when the estate was used as a military hospital. The Indian court is primarily used for badminton.

A book about the sport, Sticke Tennis by Graham Tomkinson, was published in 2004.

A book The Rise and Fall of Sticke Tennis 1874-1939 by Nigel Courtenay à Brassard, was published by Ronaldson Publications in 2017.

References

External links
 Hartham Park Stické Club
 National Trust Knightshayes website
 Tomkinson, Graham. Stické tennis: The history of the game. 
 Sports Historian - Nigel Courtenay à Brassard The Rise and Fall of Sticke Tennis 1874-1939

Individual sports
Indoor sports
Ball games
Racket sports
Forms of tennis